Prateep Pinitwong (born 25 June 1966) is a Thai judoka. She competed in the women's lightweight event at the 1992 Summer Olympics.

References

1966 births
Living people
Prateep Pinitwong
Prateep Pinitwong
Judoka at the 1992 Summer Olympics
Place of birth missing (living people)
Prateep Pinitwong